"Shall We?" (styled as "Shall we?") is a song recorded by South Korean singer Chen. It was released as the title track of Chen's second extended play Dear My Dear on October 1, 2019.

Background and release 
"Shall We?", produced by Kenzie, is described as a retro pop song that combines a sophisticated mood and romantic melody created by standard classic pop arrangements and lyrics about love.

Music video 
On September 27, the first teaser of the "Shall We?" music video was released. On September 29, the second teaser was released. On October 1, at midnight, "Shall We?" music video was officially released.

On October 1–3, "Shall We?" music video behind photos were released. On October 8, a close up cam video of "Shall We?" music video was released.

Charts

Weekly charts

Year-end charts

References 

2019 singles
2019 songs
Korean-language songs
SM Entertainment singles
Songs written by Kenzie (songwriter)